Dualite is a very rare and complex mineral of the eudialyte group, its complexity being expressed in its formula . The formula is simplified as it does not show the presence of cyclic silicate groups.
The name of the mineral comes from its dual nature: zircono- and titanosilicate at once. Dualite has two modules in its structure: alluaivite one and eudialyte one. After alluaivite and labyrinthite it stands for third representative of the eudialyte group with essential titanium.

Occurrence and association
Dualite was found in peralkaline pegmatoid rock at Mt Alluaiv, Lovozero massif, Kola Peninsula Russia. It associates with aegirine, alkaline amphibole, cancrinite, eudialyte, K-Na feldspar, lamprophyllite, lomonosovite, lovozerite, nepheline, sodalite, sphalerite, villiaumite, and vuonnemite.

Notes on chemistry
Dualite admixtures not mentioned in the formula are especially that of niobium, with lesser amount of aluminium, barium, potassium, neodymium and lanthanum. Dualite is chemically similar to labyrinthite and rastsvetaevite.

Notes on crystal structure
Dualite has doubled c value when compared to ordinary eudialyte. Its structural framework has 24 layers.

References

Further reading
 Johnsen, O., Ferraris, G., Gault, R.A., Grice, D.G., Kampf, A.R., and Pekov, I.V., 2003. The nomenclature of eudialyte-group minerals. The Canadian Mineralogist 41, 785-794

Cyclosilicates
Sodium minerals
Calcium minerals
Zirconium minerals
Titanium minerals
Manganese minerals
Trigonal minerals
Minerals in space group 160